"Every Side of You" is a song by Australian singer-songwriter Vance Joy, released on 3 June 2022 as the fourth single from Joy's third studio album, In Our Own Sweet Time. 
 
In a press release upon release, Joy said he wrote the song in July 2020. with long time collaborator Dave Bassett.

At the 2022 ARIA Music Awards, the William Bleakley directed video, filmed in regional Victoria won the ARIA Award for Best Video.

Reception
Ellie Robinson from NME called the song "a wholesome and heartfelt ode to human connection."

References

 

 
2022 singles
2020 songs
Vance Joy songs
Songs written by Vance Joy
ARIA Award-winning songs